is a theory and set of rules of thumb which were used by Gōjū-ryū karate masters (Chōjun Miyagi, Seikichi Toguchi) to extract the primary fighting applications (Oyo) encoded into karate kata by the creators. These rules were historically kept secret and passed on to the most senior students of a school only near the death of the head of the organisation. Without such a rule set describing how kata are constructed, the likelihood of deciphering the original combative meaning of the movements in the kata is very low.

Theory

The theory behind Kaisai no genri is that originally kata began as sets of paired drills or "sparring sets" practised by ancient martial artists. Over time large numbers of these drills became difficult to remember and so the defensive portion of the drills were assembled together into units and became the first kata. It is worth noting that these would probably have been Chinese martial art forms. By the time kata were created in Okinawa, the concept would have been well established.

The attacking methods were not recorded in the forms and are therefore unknown. However, they may be inferred from limb and body positioning and preceding and following movements through the process of bunkai or in Gōjū-ryū karate the process of Kaisai. It has been theorised by Patrick McCarthy that the drills and defensive routines recorded were responses to Habitual Acts of Physical Violence (HAPV Theory).

The rule set

The rule set is broken down into three basic rules and nine advanced rules.

Shuyo san gensoko - Three basic rules

  Don't be deceived by the shape (embusen) of the kata.
 The kata embusen is designed to allow the kata to be performed within a small space. The shape of the embusen has no bearing on the meaning of the techniques in the kata.
 Techniques executed while advancing are offensive. Those executed while retreating are defensive.
 There is only one opponent and he is in front of you.
 Turning to face a new direction while performing the kata does not mean you are turning to face a new opponent.

Hosoku joko - Advanced rules

 Every movement in kata is significant and is to be used in application.
 There are no "salutation", religious or empty movements in kata. All movements in the kata have meaning.
 A closed pulling hand returning to chamber usually has some part of the opponent in it.
 When pulling a hand to the chamber position, particularly if it is closed, it should be considered to have some part of the opponent in its grip. e.g. an arm,  wrist or even head.
 Utilize the shortest distance to your opponent.
 The kata will typically attack the opponent with the closest part of your body.
 If you control an opponent’s head you control the opponent.
 Kata techniques often target Kyusho (vital or weak points of the body), many of the most important of these are in the head. e.g. eyes or throat.
 There are no blocks.
 Uke are not blocks, they are "defences", however in kata they may not even represent defences, but simply be the movements of the limbs required to execute a more complex technique like a throw.
 Angles in kata are very important.
 The angle to which you turn represents the angle which you must take relative to the opponent for the technique to work. It does not represent turning to face a new opponent.
 Touching your own body in kata indicates that you are touching part of your opponent.
 In the absence of a partner to practice with, where the kata touches your own body, you would be touching or holding part of the opponent's body.
 Don't attack hard parts of your opponent with hard parts of your body.
 The kata typically strikes hard parts of the opponent with soft parts of your body and soft parts with hard parts of your body.
 There are no pauses in the application.
 The rhythm of the performance of kata has no bearing on the performance of the techniques extracted from it.

Rule sets used by other karate masters

Kenwa Mabuni
In his book Kobo Kenpo Karatedo Nyumon, Shitō-ryū karate master Kenwa Mabuni wrote that when kata change direction, the angle turned to does not indicate turning to face additional attackers, but instead indicates the angle taken with respect to a single opponent attacking from the front.

References

Books

Journals

External links 
 Lawrence Kane and Kris Wilder - Introduction to the theory of Kaisai
 Shin Ki Tai Karate Glossary: Kaisai no genri
 Mario McKenna: Seikichi Toguchi & Kaisai no Genri
 Koryu Uchinadi HAPV Theory
 Wisdom from the Past: Tidbits on Kata Part One
 Iain Abernethy: An Introduction to Applied Karate

Karate kata